Christos Naidos (born 24 December 1979) is a Greek football manager and former player, who is the current manager of Digenis lakkomatos f.c

Career
Born in Thessaloniki, Naidos began playing football with Poseidon Michaniona. He joined Greek Superleague side Aris Thessaloniki F.C. from Agrotikos Asteras F.C. in January 2004.

References

External links
Profile at epae.org
Guardian's Stats Centre

1979 births
Living people
Greek footballers
Agrotikos Asteras F.C. players
Aris Thessaloniki F.C. players
Messiniakos F.C. players
Panetolikos F.C. players
Pyrsos Grevena F.C. players
Apollon Pontou FC players
Association football defenders
Super League Greece players
Footballers from Thessaloniki